The Agency for Defense Development (ADD) is the South Korean national agency for research and development in defense technology, funded by the Defense Acquisition Program Administration (DAPA). It was established in August 1970 under the banner of the self-reliable defense. Its purpose is contributing to enforcing the national defence, to improving the national R&D capacity, and to fostering the domestic defense industry. ADD focuses on core weapons systems and core technology development, and studies major weapons platforms in high-risk and non-economical fields, unmanned and advanced, and new weapon systems for the future.

ADD is responsible for first South Korean ballistic missile Nike Hercules Korea-1 aka White/Polar Bear, developed in the 1970s with its first successful test in 1978.

ADD is the operator of South Korea's first dedicated military satellite, ANASIS-II, launched on 20 July 2020 by a Falcon 9 rocket.

Organization

Audit department 
 Director
 Defense industry technology support center

Deputy director 
 Policy planning department
 Research planning department
 Academy of defense science and technology
 Ground technology laboratory
 Marine technology laboratory
 Aeronautical laboratory
 Civil and military cooperation agency
 Safety and security center
 1st research headquarters
 2nd research headquarters
 3rd research headquarters
 4th research headquarters
 5th research headquarters
 Defense advanced technology research institute
 Research support headquarters

Major development projects 
Development programs for defense technology are categorized into basic research and development, core technology R&D, civil-military technology cooperation, and essential parts, software development and technology demonstration of new concepts. Almost all major development projects are collaborating with ADD and South Korean private defense company, most of the core technologies are developed under the initiative of the ADD, and private defense companies are responsible for the development of the remaining sub-technology and the production of essential parts and finished products.

Infantry weapon
 K1 selective-fire assault rifle
 K2 assault rifle
 K3 light machine gun
 K4 automatic grenade launcher
 K7 silenced submachine gun

Missile systems
 Hycore hypersonic cruise missile (HCM) system
 Poniard (Bigung) 2.75-inch in diameter guided rocket system
 K136 Kooryong 36 extended multiple rocket launcher system
 Biryong (Flying Dragon) short range ship-to-ship guided weapon system based on K136
 K239 Chunmoo self-propelled multiple rocket launcher system
 AT-1K Raybolt (Hyeongung) medium range infantry missile system
 LAH-AGM (Taipers) air-to-ground guided missile system
 Red Shark (Hongsangeo) anti-submarine rocket system
 SSM-700K C-Star (Haeseong-I) ROK Navy's main anti-ship cruise missile system
 SSM-710K (Haeseong-II) enhanced cruise missile system
 SSM-750K (Haeseong-III) enhanced cruise missile system
 Haeryong (Sea Dragon) tactical ship-launched land attack missile based on the Haeseong I
 KTSSM tactical surface-to-surface missile system
 Hyunmoo ballistic missile system

Missile defense systems
 KM-SAM (Cheongung-I) medium-range surface-to-air guided weapon system based on technology from the 9M96 missile used on S-350E and S-400 missile systems
Cheongung-II enhanced medium-range surface-to-air guided weapon system
 K-SAAM (Haegung) surface-to-air anti missile system
 K31 Pegasus (K-SAM) short-range surface-to-air missile system based on Crotale R440 missile system
 KP-SAM (Shingung) shoulder-launched surface-to-air missile
 L-SAM multi-layered missile defense system

Ground weapon systems
 KH178 105 mm towed howitzer
 KH179 155 mm towed howitzer
 K9 Thunder 155 mm self-propelled howitzer
 K2 Black Panther main battle tank
 K21 infantry fighting vehicle
 K200 infantry fighting vehicle
 K30 Biho self-propelled anti-aircraft guns
 Korean Amphibious Assault Vehicle II (KAAV2)
 Unmanned Serveillance Vehicle
 K-NBC reconnaissance vehicle
 High energy laser
 KAPS hard-kill active protection system

Maritime and underwater weapon systems 
 Korean Vertical Launching System (K-VLS)
 Harbor Underwater Surveillance System (HUSS)
 Towed Array Sonar System (TASS)
 Torpedo Acoustic Counter Measure (TACM)
 FFG sonar system
 KDX-III batch-II integrated sonar system
 Jangbogo-III class (KSS-III) batch-I combat system
 Jangbogo-III class (KSS-III) batch-I sonar system
 Landing Platform Helicopter (LPH) combat system
 Patrol Killer Guided (PKG) missile-class combat system
 Ulsan-Class (FF) batch-I combat system for Ulsan-class frigate
 Ulsan-Class (FF) batch-III combat system
 Dolgorae-class (Dolphin) midget submarine
 Multi-Mission Unmanned Surface Vehicle (MMUSV)
 Nobong 40 mm twin naval cannon developed in 1996 to replace the OTO Melara DARDO CIWS of the South Korean Navy
 K745 Blue Shark (Cheong sang eo) light anti-submarine torpedo
 K731 White Shark (Baek sang eo) heavy anti-submarine torpedo
 Tiger Shark (Beom sang eo) heavy anti-submarine torpedo

Aircraft and UAV systems
 KF-21 (Boramae) 4.5 generation fighter aircraft exploratory development
 KUH-1 (Surion) medium transport helicopter
 KT-1 (Woongbi) basic training aircraft
 KA-1 tactical control aircraft
 KGGB (Korean Guided GPS Bomb) precision guided glide bomb
 RQ-101 (Songgolmae) corps level reconnaissance UAV
 Corps level reconnaissance UAV-II
 KUS-FS multipurpose medium-altitude long-endurance unmanned aerial vehicle
 Light Armed Helicopter (LAH) exploratory development
 Graphite bomb

Surveillance and reconnaissance systems
 Radar for land systems
 KF-21 Active Electronically Scanned Array (AESA) radar
 Ulsan-class frigate batch-I AESA Radar
 Synthetic Aperture Radar (SAR) for KUS-FS
 Korean Commander's Panoramic Sight (KCPS) for K1A1
 Korean Gunner's Primary Sight (KGPS) for K2 Black Panther
 Sight system for K21 infantry fighting vehicle
 Thermal Observation Device (TOD)
 Electro-Optical Tracking System (EOTS) for PKG combat system
 Infrared Search and Track (IRST) for shipborne systems
 Forward-looking infrared (FLIR) system for KUH-1
 Tactical Electro-Optical and Infrared reconnaissance system (Tac-EO/IR)
 Electro-Optical and Infrared system for KUS-FS
 Electro-Optical and Infrared system for corps level reconnaissance UAV-II
 Infrared camera for satellites
 Multi-sensor and multi-source imagery fusion system

Command and control and information warfare systems
 Tactical Information Communications Network (TICN)
 Joint Tactical Data Link System (JTDLS)
 Air Defense Command Control and Alert (ADC2A) system
 Airborne ELINT pod system
 Tactical communication electronic warfare (EW) system-II (TLQ-200K)
 Airborne electronic countermeasure (ECM) pod system (ALQ-200)
 Shipboard electronic warfare system (SLQ-200K)
 Advanced SIGINT aircraft system

Space technologies
 Reconnaissance space-based surveillance and reconnaissance system
 Small satellite system
 Military satellite communication system-I
 Military satellite communication system-II

Core technologies
 Seeker
 Laser Detection and Ranging (LADAR)
 Optical Phased Array-Based LADAR
 Navigation technology
 Micromachined inertial sensors
 Fibre-Optic Gyroscope (FOG)
 Hemispherical Resonator Gyroscope (HRG)
 Control Moment Gyroscope (CMG)
 Star tracker
 Terrain referenced navigation
 Ground-Based Radio System (GRNS)
 Anti-jamming technology
 Global Navigation Satellite System (GNSS) Jamming
 Rocket propulsion
 Ramjet propulsion
 Engine Technology (subsonic gas Turbine and high speed) for missiles and UAV
 Defense materials
 Fuel cells and special batteries
 Underwater acoustic sensor
 Hyperspectral image equipment
 EMP (Electromagnetic Pulse) technology
 Directional Infrared Countermeasure (DIRCM)
 High Energy Material (HEM)
 Ballistic protection technology
 Precision-guided munition
 Railgun
 Dual barrel air-burst technology for XK13 25 mm OCSW, Cancelled in 2013.
 Warrior platform
 AI-based autonomy technology
 Autonomus tunnel exploration robot
 Rescue robot
 Tailless demonstrator UAV for KUS-FC Unmanned combat aerial vehicle
 Unmanned Combat Compound Rotorcraft (UCCR)
 Anti-Submarine Warfare Unmanned Underwater Vehicle (ASWUUV)
 Supercavitating torpedo
 Cyber security technologies
 Verification of chemical warfare agents
 Detoxification technology

Future technologies
 Artificial intelligence
 Blockchain
 Internet of Military Things (IoMT)
 Quantum technology
 Photonic radar technology
 Atomic technology
 Terahertz technology
 Perovskite solar cell
 Self-generated electrostatic energy
 Synthetic biology
 Meta-material for stealth technology
 Biomimetic robot
 Swarming unmanned system technology
 Boost phase interceptor
 Counter long-range artillery interceptor system
 Intelligent self-learning-based autonomous jamming
 Centralized sequential kill-chain

See also

 Defense Acquisition Program Administration (DAPA)

References

Government agencies of South Korea
1970 establishments in South Korea
Organizations established in 1970
Companies based in Daejeon
Military industry in South Korea
Ministry of National Defense (South Korea)